The Hulse Baronetcy, of Lincoln's Inn Fields in the County of Middlesex, is a title in the Baronetage of Great Britain. It was created on 7 February 1739 for Edward Hulse, Physician in Ordinary to Queen Anne, George I and George II. The third baronet was High Sheriff of Hampshire in 1802. The sixth Baronet represented Salisbury in the House of Commons. The tenth Baronet was High Sheriff of Hampshire in 1978 and Deputy Lieutenant of the county in 1989. The Hulse family has common origin with the Holles Earls of Clare.

The family seat is Breamore House, Breamore, Hampshire.

Hulse baronets, of Lincoln's Inn Fields (1739)
Sir Edward Hulse, 1st Baronet (–1759)
Sir Edward Hulse, 2nd Baronet (1714–1800)
Sir Edward Hulse, 3rd Baronet (1744–1816)
Sir Charles Hulse, 4th Baronet (1771–1854)
Sir Edward Hulse, 5th Baronet (1809–1899)
Sir Edward Henry Hulse, 6th Baronet (1859–1903)
Sir Edward Hamilton Westrow Hulse, 7th Baronet (1880–1915)
Sir Hamilton John Hulse, 8th Baronet (1864–1931)
Sir (Hamilton) Westrow Hulse, 9th Baronet (1909–1996)
Sir Edward Jeremy Westrow Hulse, 10th Baronet (1932–2022)
Sir (Edward) Michael Westrow Hulse, 11th Baronet (1959–)

The heir apparent is the current holder's son, Edward Westrow William Hulse (born 1993)

References

Kidd, Charles, Williamson, David (editors). Debrett's Peerage and Baronetage (1990 edition). New York: St Martin's Press, 1990.

Hulse
1739 establishments in Great Britain